Ningil is a Torricelli language of Papua New Guinea.

Phonology
Ningil consonants are:

{| 
| p || t || k || ʔ
|-
| ɸ || s || ɣ || 
|-
| m || n || ŋ || 
|-
|  || l ||  || 
|-
|  || r ||  || 
|-
| w || j ||  || 
|}

Ningil vowels are:

{| 
| i || ɨ || u
|-
| e || ə || o
|-
| a ||  || 
|}

References

Wapei languages
Languages of Sandaun Province